is a railway station on the Gotemba Line in the western part of the town of Oyama, Shizuoka, Japan, operated by Central Japan Railway Company (JR Central).

Lines
In addition to regular train service, a number of the Odakyu limited express Mt. Fuji services stop at this station.

Station layout 
The station consists of a single island platform serving two tracks. The station building is to the south of the tracks and connected to the platform with a footbridge. This station is unmanned.

Platforms

History 

It was renamed  on July 1, 1912. When the opening of the Tanna Tunnel diverted the route of the Tōkaidō Main Line south on December 1, 1934, Suruga Station became a station on the Gotemba Line. It was renamed Suruga-Oyama Station (the present name) on January 1, 1952. Operational control of the station was transferred to JR Central following privatization of JNR on April 1, 1987.

Suruga-Oyama Station has been unstaffed since 2012.

Station numbering was introduced to the Gotemba Line in March 2018; Suruga-Oyama Station was assigned station number CB08.

Passenger statistics
In fiscal 2017, the station was used by an average of 393 passengers daily (boarding passengers only).

Surrounding area
Oyama town hall
Oyama Junior High School

See also
 List of Railway Stations in Japan

References

External links

 Official website 

Railway stations in Japan opened in 1889
Railway stations in Shizuoka Prefecture
Gotemba Line
Stations of Central Japan Railway Company
Oyama, Shizuoka